El Pacífico- Compañía de Seguros y Reaseguros S.A. or Pacifico Seguros is a leading insurance and reinsurance company in Peru and one of the largest in Latin America. Pacifico Seguros is a subsidiary of Credicorp, the largest financial holding group in Peru.
Its corporate headquarters is located at 830 Juan de Arona Avenue in San Isidro District, Lima.

History

The company was established in 1992 through the merger of El Pacifico Compañia de Seguros y Reaseguros (founded 1943) and Peruano Suiza Compañía de Seguros y Reaseguros (founded 1948).

Insurance products

Pacifico Seguros offers various private and corporate insurance products. The policies cover health, automobile, life, home, travel, pensions and annuities, personal accident insurance, and many other types of risk. In addition, it offers corporate insurance products covering company’s assets, which include heritage, engineering, transport, aviation and maritime insurance.

References

External links
 Official website
 Johns Hopkins and Peru’s Pacifico Salud Sign Memorandum of Understanding

Insurance companies of Peru
Financial services companies established in 1992
Companies based in Lima
Peruvian brands